L.B.S. College of Engineering (LBSCE), or in its full name Lal Bahadur Shastri College of Engineering, is a technical institution situated at Povval village near Cherkkala Junction in Kasaragod, Kerala, India.

General information

L.B.S. College of Engineering, Kasaragod was established in 1993 as a self-financing engineering college under the propitious of L.B.S. Centre for Science and Technology, Thiruvananthapuram, a government of Kerala undertaking. The chairman of the Governing body is Hon’ble Chief Minister of Kerala and Vice-Chairman is Hon’ble Minister for Education, Govt. of Kerala. The institution is affiliated to Kerala Technological University (KTU) and is approved by AICTE, New Delhi. 

The campus is located at Muliyar (Kasaragod  dist), about 12 km from Kasaragod railway station, Kerala and 75 km from Mangalore airport, Karnataka.

Admissions

The admission for both the merit quota and management quota is purely based on the rank secured in the All Kerala Engineering Entrance Examination conducted by the Commissioner for Entrance Examinations, Govt. of Kerala.

Kerala MCA Entrance Examination, conducted by the Office of the Commissioner of Entrance Exams, is run by the Government of Kerala.

Facilities
Career Guidance and Placement Unit (CGPU)
 Startup Bootcamp
 Campus wide Wireless Network Connectivity
FAB Lab (3D printer, laser cutter, circuit board milling etc.)
 Hostels
 Central Computation Facility
 An extension counter of Central Bank of India
 Check Dam
 Central & Digital library
 Bus service 
 Co operative society
 Skill delivery platform
 ATM facility

Notable alumni
Jude Anthany Joseph, script writer and film director
 Deepak Ravindran, co-founder and CEO of Innoz Technologies
 P. V. Shajikumar, Malayalam Author, Film Screenplay Writer
 Dr M Abdul Rahiman, Director of LBS Centre for Science & Technology. He was the Founder Pro Vice Chancellor of Kerala Technological University (KTU) and Director of AICTE, Ministry of HRD, Govt of India

References

External links

 Official website

Engineering colleges in Kerala
Colleges affiliated to Kannur University
Education in Kasaragod
Memorials to Lal Bahadur Shastri
Colleges in Kasaragod district
1993 establishments in Kerala
Educational institutions established in 1993